Math is a village of the Khyber Pakhtunkhwa Province of Pakistan. It is located at 34°50'22N 71°47'12E with an altitude of 1083 metres (3556 feet).

References

Villages in Khyber Pakhtunkhwa